Music to Be Born By is an album by percussionist Mickey Hart that is based on the fetal heartbeat of his son Taro Hart, who was born on January 13, 1983. The album was released in 1989 by Rykodisc, and was later reissued by Smithsonian Folkways as part of their Mickey Hart Collection.

During a visit to the family's obstetrician, Hart recorded his unborn son's heartbeat on a Nagra portable recorder that was attached to a fetal pulse monitor placed on the stomach of Taro's mother, Mary Holloway Hart. (On the album, she is credited for providing "heartbeat environment.") Later, in his studio, Hart transferred the sounds to 16-track tape, after which he, along with flutist Steve Douglas and bassist Bobby Vega, overdubbed additional tracks. The music was then played at the baby's birth. According to Hart, the recording is intended "to facilitate and coordinate rhythmic breathing cycles, assisting the mother's concentration and focus before, during and after delivery."

Hart initially had no intention of issuing the music to the general public, and sent copies on cassette tape to friends who inquired about it. However, he later decided to release it due to ongoing positive feedback and an increasing number of requests. He reflected: "I have maybe a thousand letters and pictures of babies born to this music... Most cultures have birthing music: music to be born by. We don't. We lost that ritual."

At the time of the album's release, Taro Hart was credited as being "the world's youngest recording artist."

Reception

AllMusic's William Ruhlmann called the album "soothing," while author Julia Cameron described it as "propulsive, energizing, and grounding." Mark Saleski of Something Else! listed the album as one of his "favorite minimalist/ambient recordings," and wrote: "this record presents a warm percussive wash using wood flute, drums and bass harmonics. The pattern is altered very slightly throughout. Hypnotic is the word."

Track listing

 "Music to Be Born By" – 1:10:10

Performers 
 Mickey Hart – surdo
 Taro Hart – heartbeat
 Mary Holloway Hart – heartbeat environment
 Steve Douglas – wooden flute
 Bobby Vega – electric bass

Technical personnel 
 John Cutler – engineer
 Jeff Sterling – assistant engineer
 Tom Flye – assistant engineer, remixing
 Joe Gastwirt – mastering
 Steven Jurgensmeyer – cover art
 Fredric Lieberman – consultant

References

1989 albums
Mickey Hart albums
Ambient albums by American artists
Rykodisc albums
Smithsonian Folkways albums